The Tynewydd Colliery disaster occurred on 11 April 1877, when water from a nearby closed colliery flooded the Newydd Colliery in Porth and 14 miners became trapped, of which five died. For his efforts in the rescue, Henry Naunton Davies received the first BMA Gold Medal.

References

1877 mining disasters
Coal mining disasters in Wales
19th century in Wales
1877 disasters in the United Kingdom